Laser-powered phosphor display (LPD) is a large-format display technology similar to the cathode ray tube (CRT).  Prysm, Inc., a video wall designer and manufacturer in Silicon Valley, California, invented and patented the LPD technology. The key components of the LPD technology are its TD2 tiles, its image processor, and its backing frame that supports LPD tile arrays. The company unveiled the LPD in January 2010.

Operation principles

LPD uses a set of movable mirrors to direct several beams of light from several ultra-violet lasers onto a screen made of a plastic-glass hybrid material coated with color phosphor stripes. The laser draws an image onto the screen by scanning line by line from top to bottom. The energy from the lasers' light activates the phosphors, which emit photons, producing an image.

The building blocks of every Prysm video wall are the Laser Phosphor Display (LPD) tiles called the TD2. Video walls are implemented using this new generation LPD TD2 tile, a virtually seamless, bezel-free building block. TD2, launched at InfoComm 2013, features increased resolution, brightness and enhanced uniformity. A variable number of TD2 tiles can be arranged in arbitrary configurations to form videowalls in various sizes and shapes.

Advantages

The main difference between the LPD and CRT technologies is that the first excites the phosphor (that emits light to produce the images) with a scanning laser beam deflected by a moving mirror, whereas the second uses an electron beam deflected by a magnetic or electrostatic field.  Whereas an electron beam must be projected through a vacuum—because in a gas, liquid, or solid medium the electrons would collide with atoms of the medium and combine with them to form ions—a laser beam can pass through air, so unlike a CRT, an LPD does not require a heavy airtight vacuum envelope (typically of glass) around the space between the beam source and the phosphor screen.  Also, the collisions of the laser photons with the phosphor screen do not produce x-rays as a side effect, whereas electrons colliding with a screen in a vacuum do produce x-rays, requiring radiation shielding in a CRT (said shielding taking the form of leaded glass in most CRTs produced since the early 1980s) but not in a LPD.  The absence of x-ray risk in LPD devices also eliminates the need for the safety circuits required in CRT monitors to shut down the display if it malfunctions so as to emit increased and unsafe levels of x-rays (which can happen if the high voltage applied to the tube increases beyond the design limit of the display).

Another competitor, plasma display technology, consists of small cells of ionized gases that emit light–a process that requires a relatively large amount of power. And a conventional laser television, such as the LaserVue, made by Mitsubishi, uses red, blue, and green lasers and a micromirror device that combines and directs the light. This is essentially a rear-projection display that wasn't popular due to cost.

LPD requires less electricity than competing technologies including LCD and light-emitting diode (LED). IAC reported a 70% reduction in power by switching to LPD, and Prysm says LPD uses up to 75 percent less power than most other display technologies on the market.  An LPD device differs significantly from LCD in that more than 90 percent of the original light is lost in the latter process.

The TD2, building block of a video wall, does not suffer the problem of low brightness, contains  no toxic component, has no consumables, and generates little heat. Its displays  are highly configurable and can be stacked seamlessly to create supersized high-resolution video walls of almost any size or shape.

According to Prysm, the LPD technology has other advantages including great black levels, a wide 180-degree viewing angle, a 65,000-hour panel life with no burn-in issues, completely recyclable components, and their production process is mercury free.[*]

LPD competes with liquid crystal display (LCD), plasma display panel (PDP), surface electron display (SED) and other large-format display technologies.

One disadvantage of LPD is that the displays are deeper than some competing technologies, each TD1 Tile including all peripherals measures almost 17 inches deep. Depending on the frame type, the total installed depth varies between 24 and 30 inches.

Applications

The TD1 tile was launched in June 2010, and was the earliest embodiment of this technology. Prysm began shipping TD1 tiles in February 2011.

LPD powered by the Prysm digital workplace platform software, is used as a giant touchscreen display, a digital signage and in customer experience centers. The first LPD retail installation went on display at American Eagle Outfitters in New York in late 2010. Other LPD deployments include a 120 feet long by 10 feet tall videowall at media company InterActiveCorp (IAC)'s headquarters building in New York in New York City, a 40-foot, 180-degree, interactive videowall at General Electric’s (GE) Customer Experience Center in Toronto and television studios,  and several videowalls for venues including Dubai TV and Sprint. Prysm digital workplace platform is a shared cloud workspace where multiple users can upload and view videos, documents, presentations and other media.

Patents
  2-D straight-scan on imaging surface with a raster polygon. By Hanxiang Bai, Roger A. Hajjar. Juin 13, 2017.
  Local dimming on light-emitting screens for improved image uniformity in scanning beam display systems. By Roger A. Hajjar. December 22, 2015.
  Composite and other phosphor materials for emitting visible light and applications in generation of visible light including light-emitting screens. By Roger A. Hajjar, David Kent, Phillip Malyak. July 31, 2012.
  Laser displays using phosphor screens emitting visible colored light. By Bukesov; Sergey A. April 4, 2013.

See also

Comparison of display technology
History of display technology
Telescopic pixel display
Surface-conduction electron-emitter display
Field emission display

References

External links
Websites
Prysm (inventor of LPD) official website
 Evaluation of the Prysm Visual Workplace Solution
Videos
 How LPD Works – Prysm Inc. (2016) – YouTube

Display technology
Emerging technologies
Display devices
User interfaces